Ubaldo Cruche (May 25, 1920 – 1988) was a Uruguayan footballer who played for clubs in both Uruguay and Chile as well as for the Uruguay national football team in the Copa América 1941. He was born in Montevideo in May 1920 and died in 1988.

Teams
  Peñarol 1938-1944
  Universidad de Chile 1945-1948

Titles
  Peñarol 1938 (Uruguayan Championship)

Honours
  Universidad de Chile 1945 and 1946 (Top Scorer Chilean Championship)

References

External links
 

1920 births
1988 deaths
Chilean Primera División players
Copa América-winning players
Expatriate footballers in Chile
Peñarol players
Universidad de Chile footballers
Uruguayan expatriate footballers
Uruguayan footballers
Uruguay international footballers
Uruguayan Primera División players
Association football forwards